Incredibly Strange Wrestling (a.k.a. "ISW") was a San Francisco-based professional wrestling promotion, heavily influenced by masked Mexican Wrestling or Lucha Libre. The event combined wrestling matches with performances by punk, rockabilly, garage, psychobilly, and thrash metal bands.

Intended as an affectionate satire of Lucha Libre, Incredibly Strange Wrestling was created as a nightclub event by Johnny Legend and August Ragone juxtaposing satirical matches with live musical performances. ISW also featured many semi- and pro-wrestlers from the California circuits, and eventually showcased several professional Luchadores from Mexico. The promotion ran continuously from 1995 until the early 2000s.

History

ISW came to fruition at the Transmission Theater, a now-defunct venue (a former Transmission Shop), located at 314 11th St., in San Francisco’s South of Market District in 1995. It originated at an event at the DNA Lounge in 1990, "The Sleazefest", put together by future Hayride to Hell drummer Joey Myers, Wrestling/Music/Movie entrepreneur Johnny Legend, and local music/events promoter August Ragone. This show featured live music performances by The Mummies, The Phantom Surfers, and Johnny Legend and His Rockabilly Bastards, video presentations, and a Lucha Libre match between Ragone and future Hellbillys frontman, Barrie Evans. The Lucha Libre aspects were built upon with each subsequent Johnny Legend show at various venues around the Bay Area, until the early part of 1995, when they were tapped to do their first all-wrestling event.

Bret Kibele, a friend of Ragone's, who was working at the Paradise Lounge, informed him that club owner Robin Reichert was preparing to launch a new venue next door, and was looking for some good ideas to launch the new nightclub space. Ragone and Kibele pitched for a rotating monthly series of after-hours shows, which would include "Masked Mexican Wrestling" (Lucha Libre). Reichert told them to put together a show. Initially promoted as "Rockabilly Wrestling". Legend thus coined the moniker, "Incredibly Strange Wrestling", and sought permission from his friend, Ray Dennis Steckler, who directed The Incredibly Strange Creatures Who Stopped Living and Became Mixed-Up Zombies, who gave Legend his permission. During the first summer, ISW went on the road for the West Coast leg of Lollapalooza '95 (arranged by Legend via Perry Farrell).

Ragone and Kibele subsequently asked band manager, Audra Angeli-Morse (then employed at the Paradise Lounge), to come aboard and handle the business end of the show, while they and Legend, worked on the creative aspects. For reasons that are still unclear, Angeli-Morse forced out Legend, despite the protests of Ragone and Kibele. Eventually, Angeli-Morse started a takeover of the event, with Ragone and Kibele eventually parting ways with ISW (even though Angeli-Morse never bought them out, and they are still listed on the original Business License filed with the City and County of San Francisco in 1995). Ragone continued on with producing live events, including several Classic Horror Film Festivals at the Castro Theatre, and authored Eiji Tsuburaya: Master of Monsters (Chronicle Books, 2007), which received positive reviews, including from Time magazine. Kibele is married and currently resides in Colorado.

After the split, Legend ran his own Los Angeles-based version of Incredibly Strange Wrestling and booked matches at Horror Conventions, such as Fangoria's Weekend of Horrors, in Southern California (covered in a Flipside magazine interview). During its heyday, Incredibly Strange Wrestling was a featured attraction during many Summer festival tours, including a low-budget U.S. club tour in 1997 headlined by Me First and the Gimme Gimmes, Vans' Warped Tour in 2001, and the Deconstruction Tour (Europe) in 2003 with NOFX. After a long hiatus, the promotion announced some Summer Festival dates for 2007, but these events never materialized.

Luchadores
Participants in ISW included El Homo Loco, who wore a pink tutu, and the Poontangler, a female wrestler who claimed to have many illegitimate children (and fought several “paternity suit” matches). The ISW also featured a Scientologist boy band who would provoke the largely counterculture crowd with pop songs about Dianetics named 69 Degrees. Other ISW creations included The Amazing Caltiki, The Ku Klux Klown, El Borracho Gigante, Cletus "The Fetus" Kincaid, The Abortionist, El Asesino Postal, El Fisico Nuclear, R.U.R. 2000, Anarchie, El Hijo de Executivo, Killer Kimera, Harley Racist, Vandal Drummond, La Chingona, The Inbred Abomination, Chango Loco, El Pollo Diablo, Americon Man, Libido Gigante, Macho Sasquatcho, The Mexican Viking, the lounge lizzard, L’Empereur, The Cruiser, U.S. Steele, Risa de Muerte, and Count Dante. Most, but not all, of these names were coined by Legend. The promotion also presented outlandish gimmicks, such as the Christians to the Lions match where a cross-toting, ancient Christian named Jesus Cross fought a man in a lion suit, while the Uncle N.A.M.B.L.A. vs. Lil’ Timmy match pitted a gigantic pedophile against a teenage boy. Dead Kennedys frontman Jello Biafra, local Shock Jock Dennis Erectus, 7 Seconds vocalist Kevin Seconds and Deadbolt and Swamp Angel bassist R.A. MacLean often played heel managers at ISW shows.

Bands
Notable bands who performed at ISW shows during its height in the 1990s, include Mike Watt, NOFX, The Supersuckers, The Bomboras, The Dickies, Fear, The Ghastly Ones, Legendary Invisible Men, The Queers, Demented Are Go, The Donnas, Deadbolt, Me First and the Gimme Gimmes, and The Mad Capsule Markets.

References

 
 
 
 
 
 Beer, Blood and Cornmeal: Seven Years of Strange Wrestling by Bob Calhoun, 

Independent professional wrestling promotions based in California